William Edward Smith (1886–1956) was an English footballer who played for Bradford City and Stoke.

Career
Smith started his football career at his local sides in Lancashire, Darwen and Nelson before joining Bradford City and Huddersfield Town. In 1909 he joined Stoke who at the time were playing in the Southern Football League after being liquidated in 1908 which forced the club to drop out of the Football League. He made a perfect start as he scored four goals on his debut in an 11–0 win against Merthyr Tydfil. He went on to be a prolific goal scorer for Stoke and scored 60 goals in 138 matches.

Career statistics

References

1886 births
1956 deaths
English footballers
Bradford City A.F.C. players
Huddersfield Town A.F.C. players
Preston North End F.C. players
Stoke City F.C. players
English Football League players
Nelson F.C. players
Darwen F.C. players
Association football forwards